B. V. Rajarama Bhat is an Indian mathematician specialising in operator theory. He is a Professor of Mathematics in Indian Statistical Institute, Bangalore.

Professor Bhat obtained his MSc and PhD degrees from the Indian Statistical Institute, Kolkata.

He was awarded the Shanti Swarup Bhatnagar Prize for Science and Technology in 2007, the highest science award in India, in the mathematical sciences category.

Other awards/honours
Young Scientist Award of Indian National Science Academy in 1997
B. M. Birla Science prize for the year 1998

Books authored
Lectures on Operator Theory, (Editor jointly with G. Elliott and P. Fillmore), Fields Institute for Research in Mathematical Sciences Monograph Series, Vol. 13, Amer. Math. Soc. 323pp. (1999).
Cocycles of CCR flows, Memoirs of  the American Mathematical Society, 149, no. 709 (2001)

References

External links

20th-century Indian mathematicians
Recipients of the Shanti Swarup Bhatnagar Award in Mathematical Science